Oleg Petrov (born 17 March 1967) is a Russian bobsledder. He competed at the 1992 Winter Olympics, representing the Unified Team, and the 1994 and the 1998 Winter Olympics, representing Russia.

References

1967 births
Living people
Russian male bobsledders
Olympic bobsledders of the Unified Team
Olympic bobsledders of Russia
Bobsledders at the 1992 Winter Olympics
Bobsledders at the 1994 Winter Olympics
Bobsledders at the 1998 Winter Olympics
Sportspeople from Ufa